The Ireland national rugby union team have played all eight Rugby World Cup tournaments. They have played in the quarter-finals at all but two tournaments, but have yet to progress to the semi-finals. They have finished top of their pool twice. Ireland has never played either South Africa or England in a World Cup match.

Ireland has competed at every Rugby World Cup since the tournament was first held in Australia and New Zealand in 1987.

Summary
After a loss to Wales, Ireland finished second in their pool in 1987 but were then knocked out by Australia in their quarter final in Sydney.

In 1991 Ireland again lost only the one match in pool play (to Scotland). They again met the Australians in the quarter-finals, who defeated them by one point. Runner-up in their pool in 1995 to New Zealand, Ireland were defeated by France in their quarter-final in Durban.

Ireland finished second in their pool in 1999, behind Australia and went into the quarter-final play-offs (a system exclusive to the 1999 tournament). There they lost to Argentina, and thus, not being quarter-finalists, they were not given automatic entry into 2003.

They defeated Russia and Georgia to go through the 2003 World Cup as Europe 1. They finished second to Australia in their pool, and were knocked out by France in the quarter finals.

They started in the so-called "Group of death" with hosts France, Argentina, Namibia and Georgia in the 2007 Rugby World Cup. They played Namibia (the lowest ranked team in the World cup) in their opening game on 9 September which resulted in a narrow 32–17 win. Their progress was then put into doubt when they beat Georgia 14–10, not obtaining a bonus point. France's victory over Namibia 87–10 put Ireland's progression from the group in doubt, and this was compounded when the French defeated Ireland 25–3. Entering their last group match against Argentina, needing four tries to secure a bonus point without allowing Argentina anything, Ireland were defeated by 30 points to 15 and crashed out at the pool stage for the first time.

Ireland began their 2011 Rugby World Cup campaign on the back of four defeats in a series of warm-up tests in August, with a 22–10 victory over the United States in New Plymouth on 11 September. Failing to secure a bonus point against world cup minnows the United States, a team ranked far below Ireland, this was an unconvincing win. Contrary to preceding form, and indeed beating most commentators expectations, Ireland produced a memorable performance to defeat reigning tri-nations champions Australia 15–6 in their second pool game in Eden Park in Auckland on 17 September. This was the first Irish win against tri-nations opposition in the southern hemisphere in 32 years. It was also Ireland's first ever win against Australia in the Rugby World Cup. After comprehensive wins against Russia and Italy in the final two pool-stage matches, Ireland topped Pool C. This was the first ever time Ireland came first in a world cup pool. Ireland advanced to the quarter-finals to face Wales in Wellington. They were defeated 22–10 by the Welsh, thus ending their 2011 campaign.

Ireland topped Pool D of the 2015 Rugby World Cup with four victories and with two bonus points. Ireland beat Canada and Romania with bonus points in their first two games. Ireland then faced Italy, coming out on top 16–9, the only try coming from Keith Earls who surpassed Brian O'Driscoll as Ireland's leading Rugby World Cup try scorer with eight.  The final pool game saw Ireland face France. The winner would set up a quarter final against Argentina and avoid the All Blacks. Ireland overcame the loss to injury of key players Johnny Sexton, Peter O'Mahony and Paul O'Connell to run out 24–9 winners. The victory set up another game for Ireland in the Millennium Stadium against Pool C runners up Argentina on 18 October 2015. Ireland battled and came back from a 17-point deficit to come within 3 points of their opponents, but eventually lost 43–20.

At the 2019 Rugby World Cup, Ireland began with a 27–3 win against Scotland on 22 September before losing to Japan a week later 19–12 in the Shizuoka Stadium.
Wins over Russia by 35-0 and Samoa by 47-5 set up a quarter-final against New Zealand on 19 October.
In Joe Schmidt's last game in charge, New Zealand won easily by 46–14 to eliminate Ireland from the World Cup at the quarter-final stage for the seventh time.

By position

Matches

1987 Rugby World Cup
Pool 2 matches –

Quarter-final

1991 Rugby World Cup

Pool 2 matches –

Quarter-final

1995 Rugby World Cup
Pool C matches –

Quarter finals –

1999 Rugby World Cup
Pool E matches –

Quarter-final play off

2003 Rugby World Cup
Group A matches –

2007 Rugby World Cup

Pool D matches –

2011 Rugby World Cup
Ireland qualified for the 2011 RWC automatically.

Quarter-finals

2015 Rugby World Cup

Quarter-finals

2019 Rugby World Cup

Pool stage

Quarter-finals

Overall record

Hosting

The Rugby World Cup is held every four years, and tends to alternate between the northern and southern hemispheres. Most northern hemisphere tournaments so far has been held in Europe, with the exclusion of the Japan World Cup in 2019 and in general Ireland usually hosts some games when it is held in Europe.

1991: UK/Ireland/France

The 1991 Rugby World Cup final was played in England, while pool and finals games were played all over European nations. Pool A, which England was in, saw matches played mostly in London, though games were also taken to Leicester, Gloucester and Otley. Pool B games, which involved European nations, Scotland and Ireland, had all their games in either Dublin or Edinburgh with one game being played in Belfast. Pool C, which Wales was a part of, had all their games in Cardiff, with one taken to Pontypridd, one played in Pontypool and one played in Llanelli. Pool D, which France were a part of, saw games played in Agen, Bayonne, Béziers and Grenoble. None of the quarter-finals or semi-finals were played in England. The final was played at the Rugby Football Union's Twickenham.

1999: Wales

The 1999 World Cup was hosted by Wales, but an agreement was reached so that the other unions in the Five Nations Championship (England, France, Ireland and Scotland) also hosted matches.

The format of the pool games was similar to the 1991 World Cup in England. All Pool A games were held in Scotland, Pool B games in England, Pool C games in France and Pool D games were all held in Wales. Second round play-offs and the quarter-finals were held a variety of European venues, the semi-finals were held at Twickenham Stadium, London. The third place play-off and the final were held at the new Millennium Stadium in Cardiff.

Venues in Ireland included Lansdowne Road, the traditional home of the Irish Rugby Football Union, Ravenhill, the Northern Ireland IRFU owned venue and Thomond Park.

2007: France
The 2007 competition was held in France, with some games played in Wales and Scotland. France won the right in 2003 to host the 2007 tournament. Three matches were played at Cardiff's Millennium Stadium. Two matches were held at Edinburgh's Murrayfield. Ireland were also offered to host matches at Lansdowne Road in Dublin, but had to decline the offer as construction work was scheduled to begin on the stadium.

2023: Bid
Ireland bid to host the 2023 Rugby World Cup, losing out to eventual hosts, France.

References
 Davies, Gerald (2004) The History of the Rugby World Cup (Sanctuary Publishing Ltd,
 Farr-Jones, Nick, (2003). Story of the Rugby World Cup, Australian Post Corporation,

Ireland national rugby union team
Rugby World Cup by nation